Villaume or Villaumé is a surname. Notable people with the surname include:

Astrid Villaume (1923–1995), Danish actress
Emmanuel Villaume (born 1964), French conductor
Farid Villaume (born 1975), French Muay Thai kickboxer
Henri La Fayette Villaume Ducoudray Holstein (1772–1839), American writer, journalist and French army officer in the Napoleonic Wars
Jean-Michel Villaumé (born 1946), French politician
William Villaume (1914–1995), American Lutheran clergyman